Tolbiac is a station of the Paris Métro. It is at the crossroads of two main roads, the Avenue d'Italie and the Rue de Tolbiac.  It is near the Asian Quarter and the Parc de Choisy.

Location
The station is located under Avenue d'Italie, north of the intersection with Rue de Tolbiac. Oriented approximately along a north-south axis, it is located between the Place d'Italie and Maison Blanche stations, the latter marking the end of the common line before it branches to Mairie d'Ivry and Villejuif-Louis Aragon.

History
Tolbiac opened as part of a planned section of Line 7, which was temporarily operated as part of Line 10 until the completion of the under-Seine crossing of line 7 from Pont de Sully to Place Monge. On 7 March 1930 the line was extended from Place d'Italie to Porte de Choisy, including Tolbiac.  The station was integrated into line 7 on 26 April 1931. It is named after the Rue de Tolbiac. Tolbiac was the site of a battle near Cologne, where the Franks under Clovis I beat the Alamanni in 496.

As part of RATP's Renouveau du métro  program, the station corridors and platform lighting were renovated by 29 June 29, 2005. It saw 3,191,066 travellers enter in 2019, which places it at the 157th position of metro stations for its attendance.

Passenger services

Access
The station has four entries divided into seven metro entrances, each with a Dervaux-type balustrade and leading to Avenue d'Italie:
 Entrance 1: Rue de Tolbiac, made up of two fixed staircases established back-to-back, one of which is adorned with a Dervaux candelabra, located to the right of no. 76 Rue de Tolbiac;
 Entrance 2: Avenue d'Italie, an escalator going up allowing only the exit from the platform in the direction of Mairie d'Ivry and Villejuif-Louis Aragon, located opposite no. 72 Avenue d'Italie;
 Entrance 3: Rue Toussaint-Féron, comprising two fixed back-to-back staircases, one of which has a Dervaux mast, leading to the right of numbers 55 and 57 on the avenue;
 Entrance 4: Rue de la Maison-Blanche, also made up of two fixed back-to-back staircases, one of which has a Dervaux totem, located opposite numbers 61 and 63 on the avenue.

Station layout

Platforms
Tolbiac is a standard configuration station. It has two platforms separated by the metro tracks and the vault is elliptical. The decoration is of the style used for the majority of metro stations. The lighting canopies are white and rounded in the Gaudin style of the renouveau du métro des années 2000, and the bevelled white ceramic tiles cover the upright walls, the vault and the tunnel exits. The advertising frames are in honey-coloured faience and the name of the station is also in faience in the style of the original CMP. The Motte style seats are red.

Bus connections
The station is served by lines 47 and 62 and by the urban service La Traverse Bièvre Montsouris of the RATP Bus Network.

Nearby
 Quartier Asiatique
 Parc de Choisy
 Lycée Claude-Monet

References

Paris Métro stations in the 13th arrondissement of Paris
Railway stations in France opened in 1930